José Miranda may refer to:

 José Miranda (footballer) (born 1986), Cuban footballer
 Jose Miranda (soccer) (born c. 1972), American soccer player and coach
 Jose Miranda (politician) (born 1985), American politician in Pennsylvania
 José Miranda (baseball) (born 1998), Puerto Rican baseball player
 José Salvador Miranda (runner) (born 1971), Mexican middle-distance runner

See also
 Josete Miranda (born 1998), Spanish footballer
 San José de Miranda, a town in Colombia
 
 Miranda (surname)
 José Luis de Jesús Miranda (1946–2013), leader of the Creciendo en Gracia sect